Bottle Island (Scottish Gaelic: Eilean a' Bhotail) is one of the Summer Isles in Loch Broom, Scotland.
So called because of its shape, an alternative name is Eilean Druim Briste, "broken ridge island".

It is a popular dive site.

References

External links

Summer Isles
Islands of Highland (council area)
Underwater diving sites in Scotland